Eye Spy with My Little Eye was the 5th release in Subconscious Communications's 'From The Vault' series. It is a collection of unreleased tracks, demos and rewritten or original material made over the lifespan of The Tear Garden. More information below.

Track listing
Perforated Man - 5:18
A Bitter Pill - 5:57
The Train to China - 2:37
Extract from Empathy #2 - 9:34
Splatterflick - 12:02
Black Curtains - 4:20
The Bomb Bomb Loopapa Tribe Drown Themselves in a Vat of Marmite - 4:48
All the Stars Are Falling - 5:18
Extract from Empathy #3 - 1:55
Dr. Chang's Tummy Rub - 3:50

Notes
Limited to 1000 hand-numbered copies available through Subconscious mailorder.

Jams from the original lineup of Edward Ka-Spel, cEvin Key and fellow LPD and Skinny Puppy members.

Produced and arranged by the Tear Garden.

Mastered by Brad Vance at DNA.

Tracks are said to range from very early (demos from 1986) to a brand new track (Dr. Chang's Tummy Rub).

Misc
Dr. Chang's Tummy Rub was originally titled 'Changer'. The name change is dedicated to one of cEvin's pet cats, Chang (1996-2002).

Extract From Empathy #2 and Extract From Empathy #3 are more fragments taken from 'The Empathy Session', previous fragments can be found on The Last Man To Fly LP and Sheila Liked The Rodeo EP. More information about 'The Empathy Session' and the fragments can be found here: http://home.earthlink.net/~coreygoldberg/tg/empathysession.htm

The Bomb Bomb Loopapa Tribe Drown Themselves In A Vat Of Marmite had the word 'Drown' mislabelled as 'Down' on the initial pressings of the album. The title of this track is related to The Legendary Pink Dot's song The Bomb Bomb Loopapa Tribe Go To Swanesa And Eat It.

2002 compilation albums